Vidoši is a village in the city of Livno in Canton 10, the Federation of Bosnia and Herzegovina, Bosnia and Herzegovina.

Vidoši is situated on a spring of the river Sturba and it is surrounded by Tušnica's hills. In the last census of 1991 there were 3021 inhabitants. Vidoši is the oldest Catholic parish in the Livno area. The name Vidoši was first documented in the year 1742. These documents stated that the religious widow, Vidošević, had left land, in her will, to the Franciscan order of monks for them to build a church.

Demographics 
According to the 2013 census, its population was 474.

Footnotes

Bibliography

External links

Parish Vidoši (Croatian, German, English)

Populated places in Livno